William Ignatius Rice (1883–1955), known in religion as Dom Ignatius Rice, O.S.B., was an English Benedictine monk of Douai Abbey, a headmaster of Douai School (1915–1952), and a first-class cricketer. He was reputedly "the only monk whose cricket performances were reported by Wisden".

In 1917-1918 Dom Ignatius served as a military chaplain on the Western Front.

During his 37 years as headmaster, he was an important influence on the development of Douai School, re-established in England in 1903, seeing it into the Headmasters' Conference in 1920. In the 1930s David Matthew, later Apostolic Delegate for Africa, congratulated him on the fact that: "no Catholic school has been so free from the influence of Arnold of Rugby as Douai has been."

He was a close friend of G. K. Chesterton for over thirty years, being one of four priests mentioned by Chesterton's biographer, Maisie Ward, as "especially intimate" with him (the other three being Ronald Knox, Vincent McNabb, and John O'Connor).

Notes

External links
Statistical summary from CricketArchive

Obituary in Wisden Cricketers' Almanack (1956)

English Christian monks
Schoolteachers from the West Midlands
English cricketers
Warwickshire cricketers
1883 births
1955 deaths
English Benedictines